The Searchers 30th Anniversary Collection 1962–1992 is a compilation album of songs by the English rock band The Searchers released by Sequel Records. This collection including all of their A-sides released on Pye Records, nearly all B-sides and many of their album tracks. The third disc featured rarities, plus previously unreleased material intended for unfinished LP from 1983.

Overview
Album was released on the 30th anniversary of the band's founding. With 84-song set this is a pretty definitive collection of the group's sixties material originally released on Pye Records from 1963 to 1967. The first disc contains singles, the second album tracks and the third rarities. This collection also includes solo singles by the band members Tony Jackson and Chris Curtis ("Stage Door", "Watch Your Step", "Aggravation"), alternate Searchers’ takes ("I'll Be Doggone",  "Someday We're Gonna Love Again"), foreign-language versions of their hits ("Tausend Nadelstiche", "Verzeih' My Love", "Süß Ist Sie") or previously unissued songs ("Once Upon a Time", "Bye Bye Johnny" or "Shame Shame Shame"). There are also five songs originally broadcast on various BBC Light Programme, which were never recorded in a studio or released on a Searchers album, incl. version of Bob Dylan’s "Blowin' in the Wind". "It was in vogue and suited our harmony style perfectly," wrote Frank Allen about this track in his autobiography. The package includes discography, a family tree by Peter Frame, and liner notes by the band’s guitarist John McNally, producer Tony Hatch, compiler Roger Dopson or Tim Viney from The Searchers Appreciation Society.

Unfinished LP
In 1981 the band signed to PRT Records. "They were very enthusiastic and talked about a possible album and how we were going to be big again," wrote Mike Pender in 2014. This box consisted of few songs intended for the album that was never completed ("Innocent Victim", "Good Way To Fall", "New Heart"), produced by the Argent guitarist John Verity on September 1983. "In the end we completed four tracks with Verity," wrote Allen, "before PRT pulled the plug on the project and the proposed releases were shelved." There is also the last Searchers’ British single from this period ("I Don't Want To Be The One" / "Hollywood"), included The Kinks’ Bob Henrit as a session drummer.

Track listing

Personnel
The Searchers
 Mike Pender – lead guitar, lead vocals, backing vocals 
 John McNally – rhythm guitar, lead and backing vocals 
 Tony Jackson – bass guitar, lead and backing vocals 
 Chris Curtis – drums, lead and backing vocals 
 Frank Allen – bass guitar, lead and backing vocals 
 John Blunt – drums 
 Billy Adamson – drums

Tony Jackson and the Vibrations
 Tony Jackson – bass guitar, lead vocals 
 Ian Buisel – guitar
 Denis Thompson – bass guitar
 Martin Raymond – organ
 Paul Francis – drums

Chris Curtis (studio band)
 Chris Curtis – vocals
 Jimmy Page – guitar 
 Joe Moretti – guitar 
 John Paul Jones – bass guitar 
 Vic Flick – guitar 
 Bobby Graham – drums

Additional musicians and production
 Tony Hatch – producer, piano 
 Peter Collins – producer
 John Verity – producer
 Bob Henrit – session drummer

References

1992 compilation albums
The Searchers (band) albums